During the 2000–01 English football season, West Ham United competed in the FA Premier League.

Season summary
The sale of Rio Ferdinand to Leeds United contributed towards a dip in West Ham's otherwise good Premier League form, seeing them 8th by Boxing Day, and mystery surrounded the departure of manager Harry Redknapp on 9 May following a row with chairman Terry Brown over transfer cash for what the club needed to challenge for a top six finish next season. Alan Curbishley, Steve McClaren and George Graham were just some of the many names linked with the vacancy before it was announced that caretaker manager and former youth coach Glenn Roeder would be taking over on a permanent basis.

Final league table

Results summary

Results by matchday

Results

FA Premier League

FA Cup

League Cup

First-team squad
Squad at end of season

Left club during season

Reserve squad

Transfers

In

Out

Transfers in:  £7,050,000
Transfers out:  £22,850,000
Total spending:  £15,800,000

Statistics

Appearances, goals and cards
(Starting appearances + substitute appearances)

References

West Ham United F.C. seasons
West Ham United
West Ham United
West Ham United